Postigo may refer to
Postigo (surname)
Postigo del Aceite, a gate in Sevilla, Spain
Leon B. Postigo, Zamboanga del Norte, a municipality in the Philippines